The Triumph class is a series of 6 container ships that now operated by the Japanese shipping company Ocean Network Express (ONE). The ships have a maximum theoretical capacity of 20,182 TEU.

The ships were ordered by Mitsui O.S.K. Lines (MOL) in 2015. Four ships were built by Samsung Heavy Industries in South Korea. The remaining two were built by Imabari Shipbuilding in Japan and are chartered from Shoei Kisen Kaisha.

List of ships

See also 
MOL Bravo-class container ship
MOL Creation-class container ship
MOL Maestro-class container ship
MOL Globe-class container ship

References 

Container ship classes
Ships built by Samsung Heavy Industries